In enzymology, a biochanin-A reductase is an enzyme that catalyzes the chemical reaction

dihydrobiochanin A + NADP+  biochanin A + NADPH + H+

Thus, the two substrates of this enzyme are dihydrobiochanin A and NADP+, whereas its 3 products are biochanin A, NADPH, and H+.

This enzyme belongs to the family of oxidoreductases, specifically those acting on the CH-CH group of donor with NAD+ or NADP+ as acceptor.  The systematic name of this enzyme class is dihydrobiochanin-A:NADP+ Delta2-oxidoreductase. This enzyme participates in isoflavonoid biosynthesis.

References 

 

EC 1.3.1
NADPH-dependent enzymes
Enzymes of unknown structure
Isoflavonoids metabolism